A Raisin in the Sun is a 1961 American drama film directed by Daniel Petrie and starring Sidney Poitier, Ruby Dee, Claudia McNeil, Diana Sands, Roy Glenn, and Louis Gossett Jr. (in his film debut), and adapted from the 1959 play of the same name by Lorraine Hansberry. It follows a black family that wants a better life away from the city. A Raisin in the Sun was released by Columbia Pictures on May 29, 1961.

In 2005, the film was selected for preservation in the United States National Film Registry by the Library of Congress as being "culturally, historically, or aesthetically significant".

Plot
Members of the Younger family are anticipating a life insurance check in the amount of $10,000 ($101,000 in 2023) and each of them has an idea as to what he or she would like to do with the money. Matriarch Lena Younger wants to buy a house to fulfill the dream she shared with her deceased husband. Walter Lee, her son, would rather use the money to invest in a liquor store, believing the income would put an end to the family's financial woes. Ruth, Walter's wife, wanting to provide more space and better opportunities for her son Travis, agrees with Lena. Beneatha, Lena's daughter, would like to use the money to pay her medical school tuition.

Lena spends $3,500 for a down payment on a house in Clybourne Park, and after being agitated many times by Walter, gives him the remaining $6,500 and tells him to save $3,000 of it for Beneatha's medical school and take the remaining $3,500 for his own investments. Meanwhile, Ruth discovers she is pregnant and, fearing another child will add to the financial pressures, considers having an abortion. Walter voices no objection, but Lena is strongly against it, saying "I thought we gave children life, not take it away from them".

Beneatha rejects her suitor George, believing he is blind to the problems of their race. Her Nigerian classmate Joseph Asagai proposes to her, wanting to take her to Africa with him after they finish school, but she is unsure what to do.

When their future neighbors find out the Youngers are moving in, they send Mark Lindner (known as Karl in the play) from the Clybourne Park Improvement Association to offer them money in return for staying away, but they refuse. Meanwhile, Walter loses the insurance money when one of his "partners" in the liquor store scheme, Willie Harris, skips town with the money.

Desperate, Walter offers to take Lindner up on his offer to take money to stay out of Clybourne Park, even while his family begs him not to sell away their dignity. When Lindner arrives, Walter has a last-minute change of heart and rejects Lindner's offer. The Youngers eventually move out of their apartment, fulfilling their dream. The future seems uncertain and slightly dangerous, but they believe that they can succeed through optimism, determination, and remaining together as a family.

Cast

Awards and reception
Rotten Tomatoes gives the film a 90% rating from 50 reviews.

Ruby Dee won the National Board of Review Award for Best Supporting Actress. Both Poitier and McNeil were nominated for Golden Globe Awards, and director Petrie received a special "Gary Cooper Award" at the 1961 Cannes Film Festival.

Claudia McNeil received rave reviews for her performance and was nominated for the Golden Globe Award for Best Actress in a Motion Picture – Drama and the BAFTA Award for Best Actress in a Leading Role.

See also
 List of American films of 1961

References

External links

 
 
 
 
 
 A Raisin in the Sun: Resistance and Joy an essay by Sarita Cannon at the Criterion Collection

1961 drama films
1961 films
African-American drama films
American black-and-white films
American films based on plays
Films about dysfunctional families
Films about inheritances
Films about race and ethnicity
Films directed by Daniel Petrie
Films scored by Laurence Rosenthal
Films set in Chicago
Films set in the 1950s
United States National Film Registry films
1960s English-language films
1960s American films